The Niederbauen-Chulm is a mountain of the Urner Alps, overlooking Lake Lucerne in Central Switzerland. Its 1,923 metre high summit is located on the border between the cantons of Nidwalden and Uri.

References

External links

 Niederbauen-Chulm on Hikr

Mountains of Switzerland
Mountains of the Alps
Mountains of Nidwalden
Mountains of the canton of Uri
Nidwalden–Uri border
One-thousanders of Switzerland